Allium stocksianum is a species of flowering plant in the Amaryllidaceae family. It is native to Pakistan, Afghanistan and Iran. It is a perennial herb up to 15 cm tall, with a bulb up to 20 mm across. Umbels are hemispherical, up to 5 cm across, with pink to purple flowers.

References

stocksianum
Onions
Flora of Afghanistan
Flora of Iran
Flora of Pakistan
Plants described in 1843
Taxa named by Pierre Edmond Boissier